Nazaré is a Portuguese telenovela which began airing on SIC on 9 September 2019 and ending on 8 January 2021.

Plot 
Nazaré is a force of nature. Young, determined, strong and willing to do almost anything to save her mother's life, which depends on an expensive surgery.

At the fisherman's village, blessed with the big waves, where Nazaré lives, she does some hard work to save up some money. Boyfriend and childhood sweetheart Toni is always there to back her up.

Wood industry mogul and owner of Atlantida, António Blanco, will discover his brother and business partner Félix is stealing money from the company. From confidence to complete distrust, António will order his brother to move out of his home and leave the business. But Félix and wife Verónica have a plan: they order a forest fire that will impact everyone's lives.

One love is forged by fire and one death will change everything.

Toni knows that the fire will happen. He was hired to set it. He also knows that the Blanco's house will be empty so he convinces Nazaré to come along with him to loot whatever they can, and she ends up being caught by surveillance cameras...

During the robbery, and in the middle of the fire, Nazare ends up saving Duarte's life, the spoiled playboy of the family, whom Felix wanted to kill along with his father, once he would (and will) inherit the company's presidency.

The closeness between Nazaré and Duarte will become the perfect motto for Felix to make Nazaré an offer she can't refuse: to befriend Duarte in exchange for her mother's treatments.

Cast

Series overview

References

External links
 

Portuguese telenovelas
2019 telenovelas
2019 Portuguese television series debuts
2021 Portuguese television series endings
Sociedade Independente de Comunicação telenovelas
Portuguese-language telenovelas